Leonardo Bruno dos Santos Silva known as China (born August 14, 1980 in Rio de Janeiro, Brazil) is a Brazilian footballer of Chinese heritage as a right back.

Career
Dos Santos Silva is a strong right-back who began his football career with Bangor and had spells with Palmeiras, América-RJ and Volta Redonda before he joined Flamengo in 2004.

In 2005, he moved to VfL Bochum. China helped the German club to rise to the first division and gained some prominence in European football. However, he preferred to return to Brazil in 2006 to Paysandu, Campeonato Paraense defending champions, then go through Coritiba, Avaí and in 2008, competed in the Campeonato Carioca at  Madureira.

Later that year, after the state fair, China joined the European club Paços Ferreira, Portugal, signing a contract for two years. He was released before the end of the contract. A major factor in the withdrawal from the Portuguese club was a knee ligament problem that haunted him for some time.

After spending most of 2008 and 2009 without any action, China was hired by the Volta Redonda to compete in the Campeonato Carioca 2010 and later that year ended up going to Bangu, where he played the Série D of the Brazilian Championship.

After his contract with Bangu was done, China joined Série B side ABC on May 18, 2011.

References

External links

1980 births
2. Bundesliga players
ABC Futebol Clube players
America Football Club (RJ) players
Avaí FC players
Bangu Atlético Clube players
CR Flamengo footballers
Coritiba Foot Ball Club players
F.C. Paços de Ferreira players
Living people
Madureira Esporte Clube players
Paysandu Sport Club players
Sociedade Esportiva Palmeiras players
VfL Bochum players
Volta Redonda FC players
Association football fullbacks
Footballers from Rio de Janeiro (city)
Brazilian footballers